Kalapuyan (also Kalapuya) is a small extinct language family that was spoken in the Willamette Valley of Western Oregon, United States. It consists of three languages.

The Kalapuya language is currently in a state of revival. Kalapuyan descendants in the southernmost Kalapuya region of Yoncalla, Oregon published 100 copies of a comprehensive dictionary, with plans to expand.

Family division
Kalapuyan consists of

 1. Northern Kalapuya † (also known as Tualatin–Yamhill)
 2. Central Kalapuya † (several dialects, including Santiam)
 3. Yoncalla † (also known as Southern Kalapuya)

Genetic relations

Kalapuyan is usually connected with the various Penutian proposals, originally as part of an Oregon Penutian branch along with Takelma, Siuslaw, Alsea and Coosan. A special relationship with Takelma had been proposed, together forming a "Takelma–Kalapuyan" or "Takelman" family. However, an unpublished paper by Tarpent & Kendall (1998) finds this relationship to be unfounded because of the extremely different morphological structures of Takelma and Kalapuyan.

Proto-language
Below is a list of Proto-Kalapuyan reconstructions by Shipley (1970):

{| class="wikitable sortable" style="font-size: 85%"
! no. !! gloss !! Proto-Kalapuyan
|-
| 1 || all || *pu-
|-
| 2 || bad || *khaskha
|-
| 3 || big || *pala
|-
| 4 || bird || *twi(ː)ca
|-
| 5 || bite || *yiːk
|-
| 6 || black || *muː
|-
| 7 || blood || *nu
|-
| 8 || blow || *puː-
|-
| 9 || bone || *ca
|-
| 10 || burn || *y-
|-
| 11 || cold || *tuːku
|-
| 12 || come || *ma-
|-
| 13 || come || -
|-
| 14 || cut || -
|-
| 15 || dig || *hu-
|-
| 16 || dog || *tal
|-
| 17 || drink || *kʷh-
|-
| 18 || dry || *chakkaluː
|-
| 19 || dull || *tu-
|-
| 20 || dust || *skuːp
|-
| 21 || earth || *nuwa
|-
| 22 || eat || *kʷVnafu
|-
| 23 || egg || *pha
|-
| 24 || eye || *kʷhillaːk, *kʷhalliːk
|-
| 25 || fall || 
|-
| 26 || father || *-fa-
|-
| 27 || father || *maːma
|-
| 28 || fear || *n-
|-
| 29 || fear || *yakla
|-
| 30 || feather || *lunka
|-
| 31 || few || *puː(n)
|-
| 32 || five || *waːn
|-
| 33 || flower || *puːk
|-
| 34 || four || *tapa
|-
| 35 || fruit || *kayna
|-
| 36 || give || *tiː
|-
| 37 || good || *suː
|-
| 38 || grass || *luːkʷa
|-
| 39 || green || *ci-
|-
| 40 || guts || *niːya
|-
| 41 || hair, head || *kʷaː
|-
| 42 || hand || *laːkʷa
|-
| 43 || he || *kʷawk
|-
| 44 || hear || *kapt
|-
| 45 || heart || *-uːpna
|-
| 46 || heavy || *kayt
|-
| 47 || hot || *ʔuːk
|-
| 48 || I || *chi
|-
| 49 || ice || *tic
|-
| 50 || kill || *tah-
|-
| 51 || know || *yukhu
|-
| 52 || lake || *paːɫ
|-
| 53 || leaf || *takhVɫ
|-
| 54 || left || *kay
|-
| 55 || liver || *paw
|-
| 56 || long || *puːs
|-
| 57 || louse || *t-
|-
| 58 || man || *ʔuːyhi
|-
| 59 || many || -
|-
| 60 || meat || *muːkhi, *muːkʷhi
|-
| 61 || mother || *naːna
|-
| 62 || mountain || *maːfuː
|-
| 64 || name || *kʷat
|-
| 65 || neck || *puː- -k
|-
| 66 || new || *pa(n)ɫa
|-
| 67 || nose || *nuːna
|-
| 68 || not || *waːnk
|-
| 69 || old || *yuː(k)
|-
| 70 || one || -
|-
| 71 || other || *wana
|-
| 72 || path || *kawni
|-
| 73 || person || *mim
|-
| 74 || pierce || *twa-
|-
| 75 || push || *t-
|-
| 76 || red || *c- -l
|-
| 77 || river || *cal
|-
| 78 || rope || *cal
|-
| 79 || round || *(wi)luː
|-
| 80 || saliva || *ta(w)f
|-
| 81 || say || *na(ka)
|-
| 82 || sea || *minlak
|-
| 83 || see || *huːthu
|-
| 84 || sew || *-aːkʷaː(t)
|-
| 85 || short || *-u(w)pna
|-
| 86 || sing || *kawt
|-
| 87 || sit || *tastu
|-
| 88 || sit || *yuː
|-
| 89 || sky || *yank
|-
| 90 || sleep, lie || *way
|-
| 91 || smell || *h-
|-
| 92 || snake || *(t)kaː
|-
| 93 || snow || *-uː(p)paː(y)k
|-
| 94 || split || *plVk
|-
| 95 || stand || *taːp
|-
| 96 || stone || *taː
|-
| 97 || straight || *yalk
|-
| 98 || suck || -
|-
| 99 || sun || *pyan
|-
| 100 || swell || *kuːf
|-
| 101 || swim || *kʷay(n)
|-
| 102 || tail || *tkuː
|-
| 103 || they || *k(ʷ)i(n)nVk
|-
| 104 || thick || *fip
|-
| 105 || thin || *kliʔk
|-
| 106 || think || *m- -t
|-
| 107 || this || *kʷus(a)
|-
| 108 || this || *haːs(a)
|-
| 109 || thou || *maː(ha)
|-
| 110 || three || *psin
|-
| 111 || throw || *kawi
|-
| 112 || tie || *takt
|-
| 113 || tongue || -
|-
| 114 || tooth || *ti
|-
| 115 || tree || *watVk
|-
| 116 || two || *kaːmi
|-
| 117 || walk || *ʔiːti
|-
| 118 || wash || *kaw(a)ɫ
|-
| 119 || wash || *cawC
|-
| 120 || water || *pk(y)aː
|-
| 121 || we || *stuː
|-
| 122 || what || *ʔa(k)kaː
|-
| 123 || white || *maw
|-
| 124 || wind || *-iːʈwa
|-
| 125 || wing || *wa(ː)n
|-
| 126 || ye || *mV(t)tiː
|-
| 127 || year || *miːcwa
|}

References

Further reading
 Campbell, Lyle. (1997). American Indian languages: The historical linguistics of Native America. New York: Oxford University Press. .
 Goddard, Ives (Ed.). (1996). Languages. Handbook of North American Indians (W. C. Sturtevant, General Ed.) (Vol. 17). Washington, D. C.: Smithsonian Institution. .

 Mithun, Marianne. (1999). The languages of Native North America. Cambridge: Cambridge University Press.  (hbk); .
 Sturtevant, William C. (Ed.). (1978–present). Handbook of North American Indians (Vol. 1-20). Washington, D. C.: Smithsonian Institution. (Vols. 1-3, 16, 18-20 not yet published).

External links

 The Verbal Morphology of Santiam Kalapuya (Northwest Journal of Linguistics)

 
Language families
Kalapuya
Penutian languages
Indigenous languages of Oregon
Indigenous languages of the Pacific Northwest Coast
Languages of the United States
Extinct languages of North America
Native American history of Oregon
Willamette Valley